Darwin Nieves (born June 24, 1990 in Montevideo, Uruguay) is a Uruguayan footballer currently playing for Arturo Fernández Vial of the Segunda División Chilena.

Teams
  Liverpool 2010-2011
  Arturo Fernández Vial 2012–present

References
 Profile at BDFA 
 
 Profile at Tenfield Digital 

1990 births
Living people
Uruguayan footballers
Association football goalkeepers
Liverpool F.C. (Montevideo) players
C.D. Arturo Fernández Vial footballers
Uruguayan Segunda División players
Segunda División Profesional de Chile players
Uruguayan expatriate footballers
Uruguayan expatriate sportspeople in Chile
Expatriate footballers in Chile
Footballers from Montevideo